Jan Hejduk (born 13 February 1947) is a Czechoslovak boxer. He competed in the men's middleweight event at the 1968 Summer Olympics.

References

External links
 

1947 births
Living people
Czech male boxers
Czechoslovak male boxers
Olympic boxers of Czechoslovakia
Boxers at the 1968 Summer Olympics
People from Děčín District
Middleweight boxers
Sportspeople from the Ústí nad Labem Region